Matthews Beach is a neighborhood in Seattle, Washington; it and Meadowbrook are the southern neighborhoods of the annexed township of Lake City (1954).

The general boundaries of Matthews Beach are:  
 bounded on the north by NE 120th Street and Lakeside Place NE, the Cedar Park neighborhood,
 on the east by Lake Washington;
 on the south by NE 95th Street and Paisley Drive NE, the Sand Point and View Ridge neighborhoods; and
 on the west by 35th and 45th avenues, the Meadowbrook neighborhood (see map.

Neighborhoods in Seattle are informal.  The residents living west of Sand Point Way may consider themselves belonging to the adjacent neighborhoods of Meadowbrook or Wedgwood. The entirely residential neighborhood abuts Lake Washington and includes Matthews Beach, a seasonally popular city park with the largest Fresh water swimming beach in the city.

History
Matthews Beach is named after John G. Matthews, who had his homestead on the site in the 1880s. What is now Matthews Beach neighborhood has been inhabited since the end of the last glacial period (c. 8,000 BCE—10,000 years ago).

Matthews Beach Park
The Burke–Gilman Trail borders Matthews Beach Park on the west and follows the course of the old Northern Pacific Railway line, originally of Judge Burke and Daniel Gilman's Seattle, Lake Shore and Eastern Railway (c. 1886).  The low-lying areas of the park and adjacent neighborhood is a former wetland which surrounded the mouth of Thornton Creek.  As with nearby Magnuson Park at Sand Point, most of the wetland disappeared when the Army Corps of Engineers lowered the lake in 1916 by building the Montlake Cut and the Lake Washington Ship Canal.  The area south of the main beach was the site of Pan Am's offices and the dock for Pan Am’s Boeing "Clipper Ships"—the world’s first commercial air transports over ocean.  

Matthews Beach Park now boasts a hilly knoll with towering Douglas firs and other trees, picnic tables, a playground, and a swimming beach with lifeguards and a diving platform in summer months.  Thornton Creek empties at the southern end of the park, which has been partially rehabilitated to include a wildlife pond, native plants, and bird nesting areas.  The Thornton Creek watershed has hosted at least five indigenous species of Pacific salmon and trout, and has been the subject of daylighting efforts at locations further upstream.

Gallery

See also 
Thornton Creek
Meadowbrook neighborhood
Northgate district

References

Further reading
   See heading, "Note about limitations of these data".
  
  Page links to "Village Descriptions Duwamish-Seattle section". Recommended start is Coast Salish Villages of Puget Sound.Dailey referenced "Puget Sound Geography" by T. T. Waterman.  Washington DC:  National Anthropological Archives, mss. [n.d.] [ref. 2]; Duwamish et al. vs. United States of America, F-275.  Washington DC: US Court of Claims, 1927. [ref. 5]; "Indian Lake Washington" by David Buerge in the Seattle Weekly, 1–7 August 1984 [ref. 8]; "Seattle Before Seattle" by David Buerge in the Seattle Weekly, 17–23 December 1980. [ref. 9]; The Puyallup-Nisqually by Marian W. Smith.  New York: Columbia University Press, 1940. [ref. 10].  
  Note caveat in footer.
   History excerpted from Morgan, Brandt. Enjoying Seattle's parks. Seattle: Greenwood Publications, 1979. 
   Sources for this atlas and the neighborhood names used in it include a 1980 neighborhood map produced by the Department of Community Development (relocated to the Department of Neighborhoods and other agencies), Seattle Public Library indexes, a 1984-1986 Neighborhood Profiles feature series in the Seattle Post-Intelligencer, numerous parks, land use and transportation planning studies, and records in the Seattle Municipal Archives.  [Maps "NN-1120S", "NN-1130S", "NN-1140S".Jpg [sic] dated 13 June 2002; "NN-1030S", "NN-1040S".jpg dated 17 June 2002.]
   See also Bibliography at Lake City for complete list Wilma referenced.
"Matthews Beach Photo Archive", Information Services, Seattle City Clerk's Office.
   "with additions by Sunny Walter and local Audubon chapters."  Viewing locations only; the book has walks, hikes, wildlife, and natural wonders.  Walter excerpted from
   See "Northeast Seattle" section, bullet points "Meadowbrook", "Paramount Park Open Space", "North Seattle Community College Wetlands", and "Sunny Walter -- Twin Ponds".

External links

"Matthews Beach Park", Seattle Parks and Recreation.
Seattle City Clerk: Matthews Beach neighborhood